National Route 323 is a national highway of Japan connecting the cities of Saga and Karatsu in Saga prefecture in Japan, with a total length of 46.8 km (29.08 mi).

References

National highways in Japan
Roads in Saga Prefecture